Patrick Griffin held the Chair of Education (Assessment) at the University of Melbourne and was for 26 years the founding Director of the Assessment Research Centre. He was the Deputy Dean of the Melbourne Graduate School of Education. He has published more than 30 books and more  than 240 journal articles government reports on assessment and evaluation topics that include competency development, language proficiency, industrial literacy, school literacy and numeracy profile development, professional standards portfolio assessment and online assessment and calibration.

Professor Griffin has been awarded the John Smythe medal for excellence in research for his work on profiling literacy development and his work on profile reporting was identified in the annual 1996 yearbook of the American Society for Curriculum Development in Washington as world's best practice.  He is a project team leader for UNESCO in southern Africa, and was awarded, in 2005, a UNESCO Research Medal by the Ministers of Education from southern African nations. Professor Griffin is a World Bank consultant in Vietnam and China, leading national and international teams in studies of literacy and numeracy assessment and has developed a system of teacher assessment recently signed into law by the Vietnam Government to be applied to more than 380000 teachers and to be replicated in China. His work currently focuses on item response modelling applications in interpretive frameworks for criterion referenced performance and developmental competence assessment. He has also addressed major professional associations, and taught and conducted assessment and evaluation research projects in Australia, Hong Kong, France, Ireland, the United States, Vietnam, China, New Zealand, Canada and Britain. Professor Griffin is one of only six Australians admitted to the International Academy of Education. His current work includes the application of item response modelling to performance assessment and the development of professional standards for classroom teachers and educational managers in Australia, Vietnam and China.

References

External links 
 Patrick Griffin Biography at the University of Melbourne
 Patrick Griffin: 'Find an Expert'
 Patrick Griffin: 'Who's Who'

Living people
Academic staff of the University of Melbourne
Place of birth missing (living people)
Year of birth missing (living people)